Oscar Jorge Del Solar Villarroel  is a Chilean soccer manager.

Career
Del Solar has coached a number of Chilean teams, including Deportes Concepción, Audax Italiano and Rangers de Talca. He coached the Lanús reserves and Tiro Federal in Argentina, Alianza FC of El Salvador and Rampla Juniors of Uruguay.

His last club was Deportes Concepción from 2021 to 2022.

Honours
Lanús (reserves)
 Campeonato Reserva (2): 1991 Apertura, 1991 Clausura

References

External links

 Oscar Del Solar vuelve nuevamente a Rangers at El Amaule
 Primera División Argentina statistics

1958 births
Living people
Chilean football managers
Chilean expatriate football managers
Chilean Primera División managers
Primera B de Chile managers
Argentine Primera División managers
Uruguayan Primera División managers
Segunda División Profesional de Chile managers
Deportes Concepción (Chile) managers
Audax Italiano managers
Rangers de Talca managers
El Salvador national football team managers
Tiro Federal managers
Rampla Juniors managers
Ñublense managers
Cobresal managers
Chilean expatriate sportspeople in Argentina
Chilean expatriate sportspeople in El Salvador
Chilean expatriate sportspeople in Uruguay
Chilean expatriate sportspeople in Ecuador
Expatriate football managers in Argentina
Expatriate football managers in El Salvador
Expatriate football managers in Uruguay
Expatriate football managers in Ecuador